Epithelium or epithelial tissue is one of the four basic types of animal tissue, along with connective tissue, muscle tissue and nervous tissue. It is a thin, continuous, protective layer of compactly packed cells with a little intercellular matrix. Epithelial tissues line the outer surfaces of organs and blood vessels throughout the body, as well as the inner surfaces of cavities in many internal organs. An example is the epidermis, the outermost layer of the skin.

There are three principal shapes of epithelial cell: squamous (scaly), columnar, and cuboidal. These can be arranged in a singular layer of cells as simple epithelium, either squamous, columnar, or cuboidal, or in layers of two or more cells deep as stratified (layered), or compound, either squamous, columnar or cuboidal. In some tissues, a layer of columnar cells may appear to be stratified due to the placement of the nuclei. This sort of tissue is called pseudostratified. All glands are made up of epithelial cells. Functions of epithelial cells include diffusion, filtration, secretion, selective absorption, germination, and transcellular transport. Compound epithelium has protective functions.

Epithelial layers contain no blood vessels (avascular), so they must receive nourishment via diffusion of substances from the underlying connective tissue, through the basement membrane. Cell junctions are especially abundant in epithelial tissues.

Classification

Simple epithelium 
Simple epithelium is a single layer of cells with every cell in direct contact with the basement membrane that separates it from the underlying connective tissue. In general, it is  found where absorption and filtration occur. The thinness of the epithelial barrier facilitates these processes.

In general, epithelial tissues are classified by the number of their layers and by the shape and function of the cells.   The basic cell types are squamous, cuboidal, and columnar, classed by their shape.

By layer, epithelium is classed as either simple epithelium, only one cell thick (unilayered), or stratified epithelium having two or more cells in thickness, or multi-layered – as stratified squamous epithelium, stratified cuboidal  epithelium, and stratified columnar epithelium, and both types of layering can be made up of any of the cell shapes. However, when taller simple columnar epithelial cells are viewed in cross section showing several nuclei appearing at different heights, they can be confused with stratified epithelia. This kind of epithelium is therefore described as pseudostratified columnar epithelium.

Transitional epithelium has cells that can change from squamous to cuboidal, depending on the amount of tension on the epithelium.

Stratified epithelium 
Stratified or compound epithelium differs from simple epithelium in that it is multilayered. It is therefore found where body linings have to withstand mechanical or chemical insult such that layers can be abraded and lost without exposing subepithelial layers. Cells flatten as the layers become more apical, though in their most basal layers, the cells can be squamous, cuboidal, or columnar.

Stratified epithelia (of columnar, cuboidal, or squamous type) can have the following specializations:

Structure 
Epithelial tissue cells can adopt shapes of varying complexity (from polyhedral to scutoidal to punakoidal), are tightly packed and form a continuous sheet. It has  almost no intercellular spaces. All epithelia is usually separated from underlying tissues by an extracellular fibrous basement membrane.
The lining of the mouth, lung alveoli and kidney tubules are all made of epithelial tissue. The lining of the blood and lymphatic vessels are of a specialised form of epithelium called endothelium.

Location 

Epithelium lines both the outside (skin) and the inside cavities and lumina of bodies. The outermost layer of human skin is composed of dead stratified squamous, keratinized epithelial cells.

Tissues that line the inside of the mouth, the esophagus, the vagina, and part of the rectum are composed of nonkeratinized stratified squamous epithelium. Other surfaces that separate body cavities from the outside environment are lined by simple squamous, columnar, or pseudostratified epithelial cells. Other epithelial cells line the insides of the lungs, the gastrointestinal tract, the reproductive and urinary tracts, and make up the exocrine and endocrine glands. The outer surface of the cornea is covered with fast-growing, easily regenerated epithelial cells. A specialised form of epithelium, endothelium, forms the inner lining of blood vessels and the heart, and is known as vascular endothelium, and lining lymphatic vessels as lymphatic endothelium.  Another type, mesothelium, forms the walls of the pericardium, pleurae, and peritoneum.

In arthropods, the integument, or external "skin", consists of a single layer of epithelial ectoderm from which arises the cuticle, an outer covering of chitin, the rigidity of which varies as per its chemical composition.

Basement membrane 
The basal surface of epithelial tissue rests on a basement membrane and the free/apical surface faces body fluid or outside. The basement membrane acts as a scaffolding on which epithelium can grow and regenerate after injuries. Epithelial tissue has a nerve supply, but no blood supply and must be nourished by substances diffusing from the blood vessels in the underlying tissue. The basement membrane acts as a selectively permeable membrane that determines which substances will be able to enter the epithelium.

The Basal lamina is made up of laminin (glycoproteins) secreted by epithelial cells. The Reticular lamina beneath the basal lamina is made up of collagen proteins secreted by connective tissue.

Cell junctions 
Cell junctions are especially abundant in epithelial tissues. They consist of protein complexes and provide contact between neighbouring cells, between a cell and the extracellular matrix, or they build up the paracellular barrier of epithelia and control the paracellular transport.

Cell junctions are the contact points between plasma membrane and tissue cells. There are mainly 5 different types of cell junctions: tight junctions, adherens junctions, desmosomes, hemidesmosomes, and gap junctions.
Tight junctions are a pair of trans-membrane protein fused on outer plasma membrane.
Adherens junctions are a plaque (protein layer on the inside plasma membrane) which attaches both cells' microfilaments.
Desmosomes attach to the microfilaments of cytoskeleton made up of keratin protein.
Hemidesmosomes resemble desmosomes on a section. They are made up of the integrin (a transmembrane protein) instead of cadherin. They attach the epithelial cell to the basement membrane.
Gap junctions connect the cytoplasm of two cells and are made up of proteins called connexins (six of which come together to make a connexion).

Development 
Epithelial tissues are derived from all of the embryological germ layers:
 from ectoderm (e.g., the epidermis);
 from endoderm (e.g., the lining of the gastrointestinal tract);
 from mesoderm (e.g., the inner linings of body cavities).

However, it is important to note that pathologists do not consider endothelium and mesothelium (both derived from mesoderm) to be true epithelium. This is because such tissues present very different pathology. For that reason, pathologists label cancers in endothelium and mesothelium sarcomas, whereas true epithelial cancers are called carcinomas. Additionally, the filaments that support these mesoderm-derived tissues are very distinct. Outside of the field of pathology, it is generally accepted that the epithelium arises from all three germ layers.

Cell turnover 
Epithelia turn over at some of the fastest rates in the body. For epithelial layers to maintain constant cell numbers essential to their functions, the number of cells that divide must match those that die. They do this mechanically. If there are too few the cells the stretch that they experience rapidly activates cell division. Alternatively, when too many cells accumulate, crowding triggers their death by activation epithelial cell extrusion. Here, cells fated for elimination are seamlessly squeezed out by contracting a band of actin and myosin around and below the cell, preventing any gaps from forming that could disrupt their barriers. Failure to do so can result in aggressive tumors and their invasion by aberrant basal cell extrusion.

Functions 

Epithelial tissues have as their primary functions:

 to protect the tissues that lie beneath from radiation, desiccation, toxins, invasion by pathogens, and physical trauma
 the regulation and exchange of chemicals between the underlying tissues and a body cavity
 the secretion of hormones into the circulatory system, as well as the secretion of sweat, mucus, enzymes, and other products that are delivered by ducts
 to provide sensation
Absorb water and digested food in the lining of digestive canal.

Glandular tissue 
Glandular tissue is the type of epithelium that forms the glands from the infolding of epithelium and subsequent growth in the underlying connective tissue. They may be specialized columnar or cuboidal tissues consisting of goblet cells, which secrete mucus. There are two major classifications of glands: endocrine glands and exocrine glands:

 Endocrine glands secrete their product into the extracellular space where it is rapidly taken up by the circulatory system.
 Exocrine glands secrete their products into a duct that then delivers the product to the lumen of an organ or onto the free surface of the epithelium. Their secretions include tears, saliva, oil (sebum), enzyme, digestive juices, sweat, etc.

Sensing the extracellular environment 
Some epithelial cells are ciliated, especially in respiratory epithelium, and they commonly exist as a sheet of polarised cells forming a tube or tubule with cilia projecting into the lumen." Primary cilia on epithelial cells provide chemosensation, thermoception, and mechanosensation of the extracellular environment by playing "a sensory role mediating specific signalling cues, including soluble factors in the external cell environment, a secretory role in which a soluble protein is released to have an effect downstream of the fluid flow, and mediation of fluid flow if the cilia are motile.

Host immune response 
Epithelial cells express many genes that encode immune mediators and proteins involved in cell-cell communication with hematopoietic immune cells. The resulting immune functions of these non-hematopoietic, structural cells contribute to the mammalian immune system ("structural immunity"). Relevant aspects of the epithelial cell response to infections are encoded in the epigenome of these cells, which enables a rapid response to immunological challenges.

Clinical significance 

The slide shows at (1) an epithelial cell infected by Chlamydia pneumoniae; their inclusion bodies shown at (3); an uninfected cell shown at (2) and (4) showing the difference between an infected cell nucleus and an uninfected cell nucleus.

Epithelium grown in culture can be identified by examining its morphological characteristics. Epithelial cells tend to cluster together, and have a "characteristic tight pavement-like appearance". But this is not always the case, such as when the cells are derived from a tumor. In these cases, it is often necessary to use certain biochemical markers to make a positive identification. The intermediate filament proteins in the cytokeratin group are almost exclusively found in epithelial cells, so they are often used for this purpose.

Cancers originating from the epithelium are classified as carcinomas. In contrast, sarcomas develop in connective tissue.

When epithelial cells or tissues are damaged from cystic fibrosis, sweat glands are also damaged, causing a frosty coating of the skin.

Etymology and pronunciation 
The word epithelium uses the Greek roots ἐπί (epi), "on" or "upon", and θηλή (thēlē), "nipple". Epithelium is so called because the name was originally used to describe the translucent covering of small "nipples" of tissue on the lip. The word has both mass and count senses; the plural form is epithelia.

Additional images

See also 
 Dark cell
 Epithelial-mesenchymal transition
 Epithelial polarity
 Glycocalyx
 Inner and Outer enamel epithelium
 Iris pigment epithelium
 Neuroepithelial cell
 Retinal pigment epithelium
 Skin cancer
 Sulcular epithelium

References

Further reading

External links 

 Epithelium Photomicrographs
  Simple squamous epithelium of the glomerulus (kidney)
 Diagrams of simple squamous epithelium
  Stratified squamous epithelium of the vagina
  Stratified squamous epithelium of the skin (thin skin)
  Stratified squamous epithelium of the skin (thick skin)
 Stratified squamous epithelium of the esophagus
 Microanatomy Web Atlas

 
Tissues (biology)